Leszek Molenda (23 July 1953 – 15 June 1999) was a Polish volleyball player. He competed in the men's tournament at the 1980 Summer Olympics.

References

External links
 

1953 births
1999 deaths
People from Sosnowiec
Polish men's volleyball players
Olympic volleyball players of Poland
Volleyball players at the 1980 Summer Olympics